David Vincent Piontek (August 27, 1934 – May 12, 2004) was an American professional basketball player.

A 6'6" forward, Piontek played seven seasons (1956–1963) in the National Basketball Association as a member of the Rochester / Cincinnati Royals, St. Louis Hawks, and Chicago Packers. He averaged 7.2 points per game in his NBA career.  He went to college at Xavier University and high school in Bethel Park, Pennsylvania.

Notes

1934 births
2004 deaths
American men's basketball players
Basketball players from Pennsylvania
Centers (basketball)
Chicago Packers expansion draft picks
Chicago Packers players
Cincinnati Royals players
People from Bethel Park, Pennsylvania
Power forwards (basketball)
Rochester Royals draft picks
Rochester Royals players
St. Louis Hawks players
Xavier Musketeers men's basketball players